Arthur George Littleford (1868–1934) was an English professional footballer who played in the Football League for Small Heath.

Life and career
Littleford was born in Wrockwardine, Shropshire, in 1868. He played local football before joining Small Heath in 1893. A regular full back in the reserves, he played rarely and not well for the Second Division team in the 1893–94 season, though always on the winning side. He made his debut in a 2–1 home win against Middlesbrough Ironopolis on 23 December 1893. He later played for Berwick Rangers (Worcester).

Littleford's death at the age of 66 was registered in Birmingham in the third quarter of 1934.

Notes

References

1868 births
1964 deaths
People from Wrockwardine
English footballers
Association football fullbacks
Birmingham City F.C. players
Worcester City F.C. players
English Football League players
Date of birth missing
Date of death missing